Sunday Rotimi (born 9 March 1980) is a Nigerian footballer who plays as a goalkeeper for Ethiopian club Mekelle 70 Enderta.

International
From 2001 to 2004 Rotimi played for the national team of Nigeria. He earned five total caps, not counting two "B" team games that were the last games Nigeria played at Lagos National Stadium. His last two appearances were shutouts over Ireland and Jamaica in the Unity Cup played at Charlton Athletic. Rotimi was called up by Nigeria coach Samson Siasia for the March 2011 Cup of Nations qualifier against Ethiopia as a cover for the injured Vincent Enyeama.

References

External links
 
 

1980 births
Living people
Nigerian footballers
Nigeria international footballers
Association football goalkeepers
Plateau United F.C. players
Enyimba F.C. players
El-Kanemi Warriors F.C. players
Sunshine Stars F.C. players
Hapoel Rishon LeZion F.C. players
Hapoel Ashkelon F.C. players
Dolphin F.C. (Nigeria) players
Rivers United F.C. players
Mekelle 70 Enderta F.C. players
Nigeria Professional Football League players
Liga Leumit players
Ethiopian Premier League players
Nigerian expatriate footballers
Nigerian expatriate sportspeople in Israel
Nigerian expatriate sportspeople in Ethiopia
Expatriate footballers in Israel
Expatriate footballers in Ethiopia
Sportspeople from Benin City